The 1994 Clemson Tigers football team represented Clemson University during the 1994 NCAA Division I-A football season.

Schedule

Roster

References

Clemson
Clemson Tigers football seasons
Clemson Tigers football